The Mdloti River or Umdloti River flows in the KwaZulu-Natal province, South Africa.

The mouth of the Mdloti River is situated in eMdloti (part of eThekwini Metropolitan Municipality). The name Mdloti is the Zulu word for a species of wild tobacco that grows here.

References

Rivers of KwaZulu-Natal